Kahk or Kahk el-Eid ( or  ),  is a small circular biscuit that originated in Egypt and is eaten across the Arab world to celebrate Eid al-Fitr. Date-filled kahk are believed to be the origin of maamoul, a similar Eid biscuit eaten in the Levant. This dish also popular in Indonesia and called as kue kaak as result of acculturation between Arabs and Indonesian. Usually served during Mawlid or Eid ul-Fitr.

Kahk is an important part of Egyptian and Sudanese culture. In addition to its role in Eid, when it is often served to guests, it is also eaten as part of a wedding feast and is occasionally served at other holiday feasts, namely Mawlid. Baking kahk is a traditional and social activity in the region: women of a village or neighborhood, gather together to bake kahk, chat, and swap stories and recipes. Sometimes, Egyptians will prepare their kahk at home before taking it to a communal or commercial bakery to be baked and cooled. Families typically exchange kahk as gifts, and friendly informal competitions over whose kahk is best are common. The designs stamped on kahk can be elaborate and are sources of pride for Egyptian families. Kahk molds, typically made from wood or ceramic, are often passed down from generation to generation. While bakeries have always sold premade kahk, buying kahk from a bakery has increased in popularity in urban Egypt in recent years. However, store-bought kahk is relatively expensive—reaching £E70 (US$12.69) per kilo in 2009—so many Egyptians, particularly those in rural areas, still bake their own.

Etymology
The word kahk comes from the Coptic language word  . Other Arabic speaking people may phono-semantically match the Egyptian word to the familiar Arabic  ("cakes").

History
Kahk is believed to date back to Ancient Egypt: carvings depicting people making kahk have been found in the ruins of temples in Memphis and Thebes and in 3500-year-old Eighteenth Dynasty tombs. Ancient kahk were made in a variety of geometric shapes—more than 100 designs have been found—and stamped with an image of the solar disk, a symbol of the sun god Ra. Ancient Egyptians also baked pie-sized kahk, called shurik, before visiting tombs of their ancestors. These shurik were believed to function as magical amulets. Kahk remained popular as Egypt converted from traditional religion to Christianity, often being served on special occasions, especially Easter.

Kahk's Islamic history began with the Tulunid dynasty, whose bakers made kahk molds imprinted with the words kol wishukr ("eat and thank God"), though kahk rose to prominence under the 10th century Ikhshidid dynasty, who were the first to include it in the Eid al-Fitr feast. An Ikhshidid minister, Abu Bakr Mohammed bin Ali al-Madrani, was known to hide gold dinars in some kahk that were distributed to the people, a practice that entered local folklore and was emulated by later Egyptian rulers. For instance, the Fatimid Caliph spent 20,000 dinars baking and distributing gold-filled kahk for Eid in 1124 CE/518 AH, an operation of such complexity that it had to be started in Rajab, the month preceding Ramadan, and required the creation of a special government department, the Diwan al-Fitr. Likewise, Caliph Al-Aziz built a 1350 meter long table piled high with 60 different kinds of kahk and ghorayibah, some of which contained gold coins. Distribution of kahk was an important and effective means of raising public support for the Fatamid government, both as a means of appeasing the public, à la "bread and circuses," and as a form of propaganda, since kahk was stamped with messages calling for loyalty to the state or specific leaders. Archaeologists have found Fatimid-era kahk molds inscribed with messages such as "eat and thank God your Lord" ("كل وأشكر مولاك") and "thank Hafeza" ("تسلم ايديكي يا حفيظة"), with Hafeza being an official responsible for manufacturing kahk. The latter message is also an early example of branding.

When the Sunni Ayyubid dynasty replaced the Isma'ili Shia Fatimids in 1174, Ayyubid Sultan Salah ad-Din attempted to stamp out Fatimid customs, including eating kahk on Eid. Despite his great influence on Egyptian culture and politics, he failed to get rid of kahk, attesting to the dessert's importance to Egyptians. State distribution of kahk was revived under Mameluk rule. The Mameluk Sultans distributed kahk for Eid and Easter, especially to socioeconomically marginalized groups like Sufis, students, and the poor, though there is no evidence that they hid gold coins in their kahk. Like the Fatimids before them, the Mameluks distributed kahk to pacify the population and build support for their rule. Distribution of kahk to the poor and disadvantaged was continued under Ottoman rule. During the 14th and 15th centuries, charitable trusts—awqaf—were highly associated with baking and distributing kahk.

During the Islamic period, the Christian cross on kahk was replaced with sayings, geometric designs (including the original images of the solar disk), or stylized depictions of foliage. Several Fatimid-era kahk molds are on display in the Museum of Islamic Art in Cairo as important examples of Islamic art and Arabic calligraphy.

See also
 Fig roll
 List of cookies
 Qatayef

References

External links

 Kahk recipe – Amira's Pantry
 Kahk al-Eid recipe – Egypt Independent

Arab desserts
Egyptian cuisine